Jai Maa Vindhyavasini is an Indian mythological-drama series based on the life of a girl named Gauri, who is a strong believer in the powers of Maa Vindhyavasini. The series premiered on BIG Magic on 20 May 2013.

Cast
Divya Malik as Gauri
Shashank Sethi as Shiv 
Hans Dev Sharma as Gauri's Father
Akshita Arora as Dadi   
Yash Gera as Vikram
Aasma Sayed as Gunjan
Amit Sinha as Neeraj
Nirmal Kant as Surajbhaan
Suruchi Verma as Kamla
Dipti Sadhak as Mukti
Sagam rai as Sangam
Suruchi Verma as Kamla
Zoya Khan as Tulika
Roshni Rajput as Maina
Kritika Sharma as Monika

References

Indian drama television series
Big Magic original programming
2013 Indian television series debuts